A fore-edge painting is a scene painted on the edges of book pages. There are two basic forms, including paintings on fanned edges and closed edges. For the first type, the book's leaves must be fanned, exposing the pages' edges for the picture to become visible. For the second closed type, the image is visible only while the book is closed.

The fundamental difference between the two fore-edge styles is that a painting on the closed edge is painted directly on the book's surface (the fore-edge being the opposite of the spine side). In contrast, the fanned fore-edge style has watercolor applied to the top or bottom margin (recto or verso) of the page/leaf and not to the actual "fore"-edge itself.

To begin a fore-edge painting artists clamped the slightly fanned pages of a book between the boards of a special press that held them in place while keeping pressure off of the cover boards. While the paints used for fore-edge paintings are watercolors, artists needed to use them carefully. If water was first used on the pages the paint would bleed through to the inner pages or remove the gold of the fore-edges. Artists needed to slowly build up the colors of the fore-edges to avoid over saturating the paper. Watercolor was the only paint that could be used when doing these paintings because others (acrylics and oils) would crack and crumble with age.

Variations
A single fore-edge painting includes a painting on only one side of the book page edges. Generally, gilt or marbling is applied by the bookbinder after the painting has dried to make the painting completely invisible until the pages are fanned.

A double fore-edge painting has paintings on both sides of the page margin so that one painting is visible when the leaves are fanned one way, and the other is visible when the leaves are fanned the other way. It is estimated that only 2-3% of fore-edge paintings are doubled.

A triple fore-edge painting has, in addition to paintings on the edges, a third painting applied directly to the edges (in lieu of gilt or marbling). Edge paintings that are continuous scenes wrapped around more than one edge are called a panoramic fore-edge painting. These are sometimes called a 'triple edge painting.'

A split double painting has two different illustrations, one on either side of the book's center. When the book is laid open in the center, one illustration is seen on the edges of the first half of the book, and another illustration is on the edge of the second half of the book.

There are even examples of rare variations that require the book's pages to be pinched or tented in a certain way to see the image.

History
The earliest fore-edge paintings date as far back as the 10th century; these earliest paintings were symbolic designs, which may have been used for identification purposes, rather than decoration. Early English fore-edge paintings, believed to date to the 14th century, presented heraldic designs in gold and other colors. The first known example of a disappearing fore-edge painting (a painting not visible when the book is closed) dates back to 1649, while the earliest signed and dated fore-edge painting dates to 1653: a family coat of arms painted on a 1651 Bible.

A legend regarding how hidden fore-edge painting on books first began states that a duchess and friend of Charles II of England would often borrow his books, sometimes forgetting to return them. As a result, the king commissioned the court painter, Sir Peter Lely, and the court bookbinder, Samuel Mearne, to devise a secret method to identify his books. They worked out a plan to paint a hidden image on the edges. When the king visited the duchess, he spotted a familiar-looking book on a shelf. As he was leaving, he took the book from the shelf to reclaim. The duchess protested, but the king fanned out the pages of the book to reveal the royal coat of arms.

Research by Cyril Davenport (1848 - 1941), former Superintendent of Bookbinding at the British Museum gives some credibility to the legend above, naming Samuel Mearne the mastermind behind the "mysterious" art of fore-edge painting during his service as the bookbinder for King Charles II from 1660 to 1683. Further research by Davenport turned up instances of these early fore-edge paintings having been signed by "an artist of the name of Fletcher" (no first name given). Davenport reports a 1641 copy of Acts and Monuments bearing a fore-edge portrait of Charles II, signed by "Fletcher" as the earliest known example of the art.

Further research, though, suggests that Davenport's focus on only works linked to royalty may have caused his oversight of prior fore-edge paintings outside the royal libraries. Carl J. Weber, fore-edge scholar, suggests that fore-edge painting may have been in practice 7–10 years prior to Mearne's "invention". He lists a fore-edge painted copy of The Holy Bible as the first known instance of a signed and dated fore-edge painting. The painting on the 1651 bible is signed and dated by the artists: "S.T. Lewis Fecit Anno Dom 1653." Although the signature "S.T". was originally thought to be the initials of one man, Weber surmises that the work was produced by two (now) known fore-edge artists, brothers Stephen and Thomas Lewis.

Around 1750, the subject matter of fore-edge paintings changed from simply decorative or heraldic designs to landscapes, portraits, and religious scenes usually painted in full color to reflect the coming trend in popularity of the Picturesque. Modern fore-edge painted scenes have many more variations as they can depict numerous subjects not found on earlier specimens. These include erotic scenes, or they might involve scenes from novels (like Jules Verne, Sherlock Holmes or Dickens, etc.), as more popular literature featured fore-edge paintings. In many cases, the chosen scene will depict a subject related to the book, but in other cases, it did not. In one instance, the same New Brunswick landscape was applied to both a Bible and a collection of poetry and plays. The artist, bookseller, or owner decides on the scene; thus, the variety is wide.

The technique was popularized in the 18th century by John Brindley (1732 - 1756),  publisher, and bookbinder to the prince of Wales.  and Edwards of Halifax, a distinguished family of bookbinders and booksellers. The Edwards were responsible for popularizing the technique in London, and contemporaneous booksellers often mimicked their designs.

Caroline Billin Curry was a prominent fore-edge painter in the late 19th and early 20th centuries. The number of her works are largely unknown, however the current estimate is around 131. She numbered her works in the flyleaf of the book painted. Because of this, we know that her fore-edge painting of "The White House in 1840" on a copy of Washington Irving's Knickerbocker History of New York was her eleventh work. Also of mention is John Beer, of close geographical proximity to Miss Currie, both residing in Great Britain.

Not commonly mentioned is the presence of fore-edge paintings in China. Carl Weber, Shen Jin, and Yao Boyue all provide testimony that Chinese painters were influenced by Western fore-edge paintings and began practicing the art overseas. The evidence does not make a clear historical case, however it is an interesting factoid to note.

The majority of extant examples of fore-edge painting date to the late 19th and early 20th centuries on reproductions of books originally published in the early 19th century.

Contemporary fore-edge paintings 

Fore-edge painting as a craft is deemed critically endangered in the contemporary era. The Heritage Crafts Association (HCA) only lists four “craftspeople currently known” as working in this medium.

The remaining artists that practice fore-edge painting are amateurs and leisure makers numbering fewer than sixty. According to the HCA, there are currently no formal trainees in the art form.

Martin Frost in Worthing, United Kingdom, is currently the only professional full-time fore-edge artist. He has created over 3,500 fore-edge paintings since he started his career in the 1970s. In 2019 he was presented with the MBE in the New Year Honours list by Queen Elizabeth II. According to a profile he did with the BBC, his training was in theater where he painted backdrops for plays until he was introduced to this craft by a friend who happened to be a fore-edge painter.

Brianna Sprague is a hidden fore edge painter based in the US. She received her BFA in fine art painting in 2012, specializing in oil painting and watercolor. She began creating hidden fore edge paintings in 2020 and began selling custom commissions in 2021. She has created over 200 paintings at this time. Focusing on modern books and classics, she has gained attention on the social media apps of TikTok, Reddit, and Instagram.

Dispelling the mystique of fore-edge paintings 
Artist Christopher Folwell, an artist based in the United Kingdom, showed how to create fore-edge paintings step by step in an article published in My Modern Met.

Collections

College of William and Mary's Earl Gregg Swem Library holds a collection of 709 fore-edge paintings in the Ralph H. Wark Collection, the largest collection of fore-edge painted books in America.
Loyola-Notre Dame Library, the library shared by Loyola University Maryland and Notre Dame of Maryland University, has a collection of more than 300 fore-edge painted volumes.
Boston Public Library has a collection of 258 fore-edge paintings, one of the larger collections in the United States, and many examples are displayed online. 
Brandeis University holds 22 fore-edge paintings in their special collection library. 
Estelle Doheny Collection housed in the Edward Laurence Doheny Memorial Library at St. John's Seminary, Camarillo, California, is described as "roughly twice as large" as the collection at the Boston Public Library.
University of New Mexico's Center for Southwest Research & Special Collections holds 102 fore-edge paintings from the collection of Lucia von Borosini Batten of Albuquerque. Many were formerly owned by Estelle Doheny, who married her husband, oil baron Edward L. Doheny, in New Mexico Territory in 1900. Three paintings by Miss C. B. Currie are available.
Syracuse University's Special Collections Research Center has the Poushter Collection, with more than 90 volumes.
Louisiana State University Library holds at least 37 fore-edge paintings in its Rare Book Collection. Several are probably by the artist identified by Jeff Weber as the "American City View Painter".
Clark University holds the Robert H. Goddard Library's Rare Book Collection, which includes 17 books with fore-edge paintings.
Mudd Library at Lawrence University has a varied collection of books with fore-edge art that were donated by two alumnae, Dorothy Ross Pain Lawrence class of 1918, and Bernice Davis Fligman Milwaukee-Downer class of 1922.
Hofstra University has in their collection a few fore-edge books, some of which are Les Psaumes de David and Outlines from the Figures and Compositions upon the Greek, Roman and Etruscan Vases of the Late Sir William Hamilton.
George Peabody Library in Baltimore, Maryland also contains a collection of books with fore-edge paintings within its Dorothy McIlvain Scott Collection.
 The National Library of the Netherlands has a few fore-edge books, e.g. KW 1740 F 1 (a pendrawing and aquarelle in shades of blue, green, yellow and red, depicting a lake surrounded by mountains and on the righthand side a castle with docking place and boats) and KW 1740 F 2 (a pendrawing and aquarelle in shades of blue, green and red, depicting the Tower of London surrounded by houses and an meadow with walking people), 1786 B 24 or 1773 D 25.

Gallery

References

Further reading 
 Bennett, Jeanne. Hidden Treasures: The History and Technique of Fore-edge Painting. Calliope Press, 2012.
 Elliot, Samantha. “The Vanishing Art of Fore-edge Painting: The Work of Claire Brooksbank,” pp 55–62. In Bookbinder: The Journal of the Society of Bookbinders. 2011.
 Galbraith, Steven K. Edges of Books: Specimens of Edge Decoration from RIT Cary Graphic Arts Collection. RIT Cary Graphic Arts Press, 2012.
 Gilbert, Jon, Fore-edge Painting within The New Bookbinder Volume 17, Designer Bookbinder Publications Ltd, 1997.
 Hobson, Kenneth. “On Fore-Edge Painting of Books”. In The Folio. 1949.
 Weber, Carl Jefferson. A Thousand and One Fore-edge Paintings. Waterville, Colby College Press, 1949.
 Weber, Carl Jefferson. Fore-edge painting: a historical survey of a curious art in book decoration, Harvey House, 1966.
 Weber, Jeff. Annotated Dictionary of Fore-edge Painting Artists & Binders [and] The Fore-edge Paintings of Miss C. B. Currie with a catalogue raisonné. Los Angeles, 2010.
 Weber, Jeff. The Fore-edge Paintings of John T. Beer. Los Angeles, 2005.

External links

Fore edge video includes video examples
Fore-edge painting from boingboing.net
More Fore-edge painting from boingboing.net
Fore-edge painting, including pictures from ibooknet
Grand Valley State University fore-edge paintings digital collections
The Bentley Rare Book Gallery, Kennesaw State University includes video examples
George Peabody Library Collection of Fore-edge Paintings & Decorated Bindings
 Clare Brooksbank Art - Gallery - Fore-Edges
 Fore-Edge File: Books with paintings on the fore-edge, (44 titles dispersed in the division's collection). From the Rare Book and Special Collections Division at the Library of Congress
 Fore-edge paintings
 Lovely Hidden Paintings Adorned the Edges of Historic Books

Painting techniques
Book design
Book arts
Bookbinding
Illuminated manuscripts